The 1922–23 Harvard Crimson men's ice hockey season was the 25th season of play for the program.

Season
At the start of their season, the Harvard Crimson did not demonstrate a strong offensive game. They were only able to defeat a weak BU squad 2–0 (albeit with a large number of alternates) and then managed just three goals in regulation against Toronto. When they began their conference schedule in mid-January the Crimson fell to Princeton for the first time since 1917 after only being able to muster a single goal. Harvard escaped with a win in the following game against Yale after another regulation with just a single goal scored. 

While it may have appeared that Harvard was back to it dominating self after trouncing MIT 10–0, they were back to close games after a 19-day layoff. The Crimson defense remained stout through the remainder of the season, allowing just 6 goals in it final six games, but the offense was shut out twice and it was the meeting with Dartmouth on the 21st of February that cost Harvard dearly. The Dartmouth squad was one of the strongest in the nation and entered the contest with a record of 12–1. Harvard could ill afford a loss if they wanted to capture the intercollegiate title, but the offense was silenced by the Indians and the Crimson would be unable to claim another ice hockey championship.

Despite the offensive struggles, Harvard won three of their final four games, including the rubber matches against both Princeton and Yale to earn the Triangular League title. They also receive a bit of help from the Tigers, who downed Dartmouth in the final game for the Indians. The loss meant that Harvard, Dartmouth and Princeton were in a three-way tie with one another and a claim by any for the intercollegiate championship would be dubious at best.

In the team's final game of the season coach Clafin, in concert with captain Owen, invented a new strategy by changing all three forwards at the same time. This method would come to be called a 'line change' and is still used in modern hockey. While it is unknown whether or not the scheme had been used before, it was certainly the first time it had been employed in college hockey.

Roster

Standings

Schedule and results

|-
!colspan=12 style=";" | Regular Season

References

Harvard Crimson men's ice hockey seasons
Harvard
Harvard
Harvard
Harvard
Harvard